Kuy Sahab ol Zeman (also Romanized as Kūy Şāḩab ol Zemān) is a village in Esfivard-e Shurab Rural District, in the Central District of Sari County, Mazandaran Province, Iran. At the 2006 census, its population was 322, in 82 families.

References 

Populated places in Sari County